Bill Bourke (23 July 1882 – 13 November 1932) was an Australian rules footballer who played with the Richmond Football Club in the Victorian Football League (VFL).

Bourke had the distinction of topping Richmond's goal-kicking in their first two VFL seasons, in 1908 and 1909, with 25 and 20 goals respectively. He along with family members was a strong Collingwood supporter and actually first tried to play for Collingwood. Upon being denied a game as a Magpie he decided to play with Richmond who were just entering the VFL. He retired after just two seasons to drive a taxi as it paid more than his wage as a footballer. He later ran a boot factory, which employed many league footballers and was the largest in the southern hemisphere at the time.  He died suddenly of a heart attack in 1932 leaving a family of six children behind.

References

External links 

1882 births
VFL/AFL players born outside Australia
Australian rules footballers from Victoria (Australia)
Richmond Football Club players
1932 deaths
Irish players of Australian rules football
Sportspeople from County Clare
Irish emigrants to Australia
20th-century Australian businesspeople